Peter Hart (11 November 1963 – 22 July 2010) was a Canadian historian, specializing in modern Irish history.

Life
Hart was born and raised in St. John's, Newfoundland. He studied for one year at the Memorial University of Newfoundland before moving to study at Queen's University in Kingston, Ontario. He graduated from there with an Honours BA degree. Subsequently, Hart completed a master's degree in International Relations at Yale University.

He then moved to Ireland to do PhD work at Trinity College, Dublin. His thesis was on the Irish Republican Army in County Cork, an epicenter of the Irish War of Independence, which was the basis of his first book, The IRA and its Enemies. After completing his doctorate, Hart accepted a five-year teaching and research position at Queen's University Belfast. In 2003, having completed this contract, Hart moved back to Canada to take up the position of Canada Research Chair in Irish Studies at the Memorial University of Newfoundland. He was also an associate professor at Memorial University.

In the 1990s he developed cancer and underwent a liver transplant - events which permanently affected his health. He suffered a brain haemorrhage early in July 2010 and died on 22 July 2010 in a St. John's hospital at the age of 46.

Works
Hart published several books on what he termed the "Irish Revolution" of 1916–1923, arguing that events like the Easter Rising (1916), the Irish War of Independence (1920–21) and the Irish Civil War (1922–23) were parts of a greater whole.

The first was published in 1998 entitled The IRA and Its Enemies, Violence and Community in Cork, 1916–1923, being a study of the organisation's social composition and activity in County Cork during the War of Independence. This book won several awards, including the Christopher Ewart-Biggs Memorial Prize (1998). It attracted significant criticism.

In 2002 Hart edited British Intelligence in Ireland 1920–21: The Final Reports, a re-print of official British Government reports released to the British Public Records Office that detailed British military and intelligence analysis of policy during the Irish rebellion from 1919–1921.

The I.R.A. at War 1916–1923 (Oxford University Press, 2003), is a collection of essays on various social, political and military aspects of the IRA in these years. The publication represented, Hart wrote in its preface, "sixteen years' work on the history of the Irish revolution."

Hart contributed to the volume The Irish Revolution (2002), a collection of articles by various historians of the period.

Hart's final published work was a biography of the Irish revolutionary leader Michael Collins, entitled Mick - The Real Michael Collins (Macmillan, 2006).

Review and criticism
Times Higher Education suggested in 2008 that Hart's work "offers a revisionist version of events that proved highly controversial". Hart denied he was a "revisionist", calling it "pejorative labelling". In his review of The IRA and its Enemies: Violence and Community in Cork, 1916–1923, John M. Regan wrote:"Hart is neither a statist nor a southern nationalist, though the influence of both ideologies can be traced though his work. His research on localised and specialised topics subverts orthodoxy, but it is his willingness to embrace it when dealing with general explanations which surprises. His exploration of the plight of Protestants in the Free State illuminates the sectarian underbelly of the revolution that a nationalist historiography prefers to ignore. In escalating violence in Cork, Tipperary, or Dublin could Michael Collins, Harry Boland, or Ernie O'Malley be held accountable for raising sectarian tensions in Antrim, Down or Belfast? Was the cost of a southern state the institutionalisation of ethno-religious tensions in a compressed and reactionary northern state? Could revolutionary violence in 1922 and 1968 conceivably be part of one grotesque, protracted process? To accept this argument would, however, be to shatter nationalist icons important to a southern nationalist identity still rooted in its own glorious revolution."

Some of Hart's published claims attracted criticism from other historians and writers, including two incidents in The IRA and its Enemies. One was the Kilmichael Ambush of 28 November 1920. Hart challenged the account of commander Tom Barry who stated the Auxiliaries engaged in a false surrender that caused two IRA fatalities, after which Barry refused further surrender calls and ordered a fight to the finish without prisoners. Hart posited this never happened and alleged that Barry ordered the killing of all prisoners.

Hart claimed he personally interviewed two anonymous ambush veterans in 1988-89 and listened to recorded interviews with three further unnamed Kilmichael veterans. The recordings (known as 'the Chisholm tapes') were made in 1970 by Father John Chisholm as research for Liam Deasy's Toward Ireland Free (1973).

Hart stood by his work, stating that critics have failed to "engage with the book's larger arguments about the nature of the IRA and the Irish Revolution" and believing they are closed to "a real debate where people concede some things and put forward others or are skeptical about weak points and accept the strong points." Hart's last known interview, speaking in English, was in a TG4 Irish language programme on Tom Barry, broadcast in January 2011. The programme questioned Hart's use of anonymous sources and other claims. More of the interview was broadcast in December 2022, in a documentary on the April 1922 killings.

In his 2011 book, Michael Collins and the Anglo-Irish War: Britain's Failed Counterinsurgency, author J.B.E. Hittle, a retired U.S. career intelligence officer-turned historian, acknowledged Hart's overall contribution in re-examining standard histories of the period, but concluded that Hart's historical method is "problematic". Hittle cited Hart's "overall naivete" about guerrilla warfare, in particular, what he viewed as Hart's underestimation of the importance of certain counterintelligence cases to the outcome of the war, as well as faulty methodologies.

Probably due to the degree of controversy Hart had aroused, his entry in the Dictionary of Irish Biography was written, not by a historian specialising in the Irish revolution, but by John Gibney, associate editor, whose specialty is the seventeenth century.

Publications
 The I.R.A. & Its Enemies (1998)
 The I.R.A. at War (2003)
 Mick - The Real Michael Collins (2005)

References

External links
 Peter Hart homepage at the Memorial University of Newfoundland.
 Obituary to Hart in the Newfoundland Globe and Mail
 Irish Times obituary for Peter Hart
 A review of Hart's historiography, John Dorney, theirishstory.com
 Examining Peter Hart, Niall Meehan, Field Day Review 10 2014
 Troubled History - A Tenth Anniversary Critique of Peter Hart's The IRA and its Enemies, Brian Murphy, Niall Meehan'
 Marú in Íarthar Chorcaí, TV documentary, TG4 (Ireland), 7 December 2022. Includes 2010 interview with Peter Hart. 

1963 births
2010 deaths
21st-century Canadian historians
Canadian male non-fiction writers
Christopher Ewart-Biggs Memorial Prize recipients
Canada Research Chairs
Yale Graduate School of Arts and Sciences alumni
Writers from St. John's, Newfoundland and Labrador
Academic staff of the Memorial University of Newfoundland
Alumni of Trinity College Dublin
Academics of Queen's University Belfast
Queen's University at Kingston alumni
Place of death missing
Revisionism (Ireland)